Marra, sometimes formerly spelt Mara, is an Australian Aboriginal language, traditionally spoken on an area of the Gulf of Carpentaria coast in the Northern Territory around the Roper, Towns and Limmen Bight Rivers.  Marra is now an endangered language. The most recent survey was in 1991; at that time, there were only 15 speakers, all elderly. Most Marra people now speak Kriol as their main language.  The remaining elderly Marra speakers live in the Aboriginal communities of Ngukurr, Numbulwar, Borroloola and Minyerri.

Marra is a prefixing language with three noun classes (masculine, feminine, and neuter) and a singular-plural-dual distinction. It is characterized by an intricate aspectual system, elaborate kin terms, no definite structure for relative clause construction, and a complex demonstrative system. Unlike many languages in the area, it has little avoidance language and no difference in the speech of male and female speakers.

Language and speakers
Marra is a member of the Arnhem family, the second-largest Australian language family after Pama–Nyungan. In addition to Warndarrang, which was spoken to the north of Marra along the Roper River, Marra was also in contact with Alawa (spoken inland, to the west), Binbinga and Wilangarra (West Barkly languages to the south), and Yanyuwa (a Pama–Nyungan language to the southeast).

In the 1970s, when the first serious fieldwork was being done on Marra, the  clan was extinct, though a family with the surname Riley of the  clan and a man by the name of Anday of the  clan were able to provide the linguist Jeffrey Heath with cultural and linguistic information.

The three clans, together with the Warndarrang-speaking  group, made up a set of four patrilineal semimoieties, each of which had their own set of songs, myths, and rituals. Note that Warndarang people use the same system of semimoieties, under the names mambali, murrungun, wurdal, and guyal (wuyal).

In the years 1973–1975 and 1976–1977, the linguist Jeffrey Heath worked with some of the surviving speakers of Marra to create a sizeable grammar and dictionary. With the help of four principal informants – Mack Riley, Tom Riley, Johnnie (who was Warndarrang but spoke Marra and Nunggubuyu for most of his life), and Anday – Heath was able to collect grammar and vocabulary information as well as extensive texts on clan songs and totem rituals.

Marra grammar
(All grammatical information from Heath 1981 unless otherwise noted.)

Phonetics

Consonant inventory
Marra has a consonant inventory nearly identical to those of Warndarrang and Alawa.  There are two additional phonemes: the interdental /n̪/ and /l̪/ which occur only in a few flora-fauna terms, and are likely loanwords from either Nunggubuyu or Yanyuwa, both of which languages use these phonemes frequently.

With the interdentals excepted, the Marra consonants consist of a stop and a nasal in each of five places of articulation with two laterals, two rhotics, and two semivowels.

A standard orthography has been developed over several years of work with Diwurruwurru-Jaru Aboriginal Corporation (also known as the Katherine Regional Aboriginal Language Centre).  The standard orthography is used throughout this article, but the table below also gives the equivalent IPA symbols in brackets where appropriate. The interdental sounds have not been included in the table as they are only found in loanwords.

It is not clear if the vibrant is a trill or a tap.

Vowel inventory
Marra has three main vowels: /i/, /u/, and /a/. There is no contrast in Marra vowel length, though the first vowel of a two-syllable word is often lengthened, as are the word-final vowels in a particular style of story-telling. Words cannot begin with a vowel, with the exception of a handful of stems beginning with /a/.

Phonology

Clusters
Vowels clusters do not occur; all but one of adjacent underlying vowels are deleted. The only permitted word-initial consonant clusters are homorganic (involving the same place of articulation) nasal + stop combinations, particularly mb or ngg. The nominative prefix n-, when added to a stem beginning with a cluster, is usually pronounced with the preceding syllable, and the n- with combined with /r/ or /n/ results in the addition of the meaningless particle –nga- between the prefix and the stem.

Word-final consonant clusters can only take the form liquid (lateral or rhotic) plus noncoronal (labial, laminoalveolar, or velar) stop or nasal. Within a word, triple clusters are limited to a liquid and a homorganic nasal + stop cluster or to a liquid, a noncoronal, and any other consonant. Many double-consonant clusters can occur.

Lenition
In segments that are repeated in a word – either by reduplication or by chance morphology – the second stop is often lenited into a semivowel or lost altogether. /j/ and /ʈ/ will become /y/, /b/ will become /w/, and /g/ will either become /w/ or Ø. This lenition can optionally occur at the beginning of a small number of nouns when the stem is preceded by a prefix ending in a vowel.

There are also several instances of word-initial lenition of /g/ or /b/ to /w/, in cardinal directions, kin terms, and a few other isolated examples. At the beginning of verb stems, the underlying combination rrn will have the surface form of n, whereas an n followed by the phonemes l, rl, rr, r, n, or ny in any other context results in the deletion of the initial n.

Nasalization
Stops are frequently nasalized (pronounced as the nasal at the stop place of articulation) when followed by a nasal or any other non-stop.

Nominal morphology
In Marra, there is no clear grammatical distinction between nouns, adjectives, and adverbs; they are all treated the same morphologically. Personal and demonstrative pronouns, however, each form a distinctive word class, and all can be clearly distinguished from verb complexes.

Noun phrases typically consist of an article, a noun, and the possibilities for adjuncts, which often but not always follow the main noun.

Articles
Nouns are usually preceded by an article, which marks case, gender, and number. The nominative articles, for instance, are as follows:

Case prefixes
In additional to the articles, each noun is marked with a prefix containing information about case (nominative or non-nominative), gender (masculine, feminine, or neuter), and number (singular, plural, dual), as follows:

Almost all non-human singular nouns are marked as masculine, though some specifically-female marsupial terms can be marked as feminine. The neuter case is reserved for body parts, topographic terms, abstract conceptions, and the word , "sun".

Case suffixes
Nouns in Marra are marked by suffixes for one of six cases: nominative, ergative/instrumental/genitive, allative/locative, ablative, pergressive, and purposive.

The nominative is used for intransitive subjects or transitive objects – such a case is usually called the "absolutive", though some languages to the south of Marra have an absolutive case that is distinct from this usage.

The ergative or instrumental case (also , though takes the non-nominative prefix) is used to mark the subject of a transitive verb (the usual meaning of "ergative") or to mark the object used to complete the action of the verb (the usual meaning of "instrumental"). This case, along with a genitive pronoun, is also used to mark possession (see below).

The allative/locative case ('') signals the idea of direction of motion ("to X"), static location ("in/on/at X"), or motional location ("by/through X"). Though this meaning is within the domain of the pergressive case in many related languages, the Marra pergressive ("through" or "along") is restricted to body-part or topographic terms.

The ablative case is used to specify the origin of motion. It takes the form  for most nouns but  for place names.

Lastly, the purposive  indicates the goal of the verb, as in the sentence , "I set fires for game" (i.e., in order to hunt or obtain game), where the verb  is intransitive and thus , "game" takes the purposive and not the nominative.

Possession
Possession is typically marked by a genitive pronoun, though if the possessor noun (in the ergative/instrumental case) is present the pronoun is sometimes omitted. For example,  means "his camp" with the third person singular genitive pronoun , and either  or  can mean "the man camp."

Quantifiers
Marra has five basic numerals, one through five:

The numerals six through ten are expressed by combining "five" with another number, e.g.,  for "nine".

Reduplication
Like many Australian languages, Marra has a process known as reduplication, where some or all of a stem is repeated.

Personal pronouns
In addition to the pronoun markers on nouns (see above) and verbs (see below), Marra also has independent personal pronouns. Unlike other nouns, pronouns do not show a nominative/ergative distinction but instead use the nominative form to mark all subjects as well as the direct object of a transitive verb. Because these pronouns are marked within the verb clause, their inclusion is often optional and can be used to highlight a particular point in what is known as the "emphatic" case.

Personal pronouns have paradigms in seven cases – nominative, emphatic, genitive, ablative, oblique stem, allative/locative, and purposive – for each of first person (singular, exclusive dual, inclusive dual, exclusive plural, and inclusive plural), second person (singular, dual, and plural), and third person (masculine singular, feminine singular, neuter singular, dual, and plural).

Demonstrative pronouns
There are five categories for demonstrative pronouns: proximate, localized immediate, unlocalized immediate, distant, and anaphoric. With the proximate stems, there are separate forms for predicative (in the "predicate" of the sentence, or the part that modifies the subject) or nonpredicative nouns.

Proximate refers to the area around the speaker, the equivalent of "here". The immediate refers to the area around the person being addressed or to the area approximately two meters away from the speaker. The localized immediate specifies the location, whereas the unlocalized immediate, which is rarer, is more general.

The distant category refers to anything outside of the immediate, either visible to the speaker or invisible. The anaphoric category is anything within the distant category that has previously been referred to, indicating that the location is not new to the discourse.

These pronouns have separate forms for masculine singular, feminine singular, neuter, dual, and plural, each of which has a nominative and non-nominative form.

From these, one can form demonstrative adverbs, in the locative or allative cases. These have the same spatial meaning as the corresponding demonstrative pronouns, but they refer to a general location rather than the location of a specific noun. The allative forms are summarized in the following table:

Cardinal directions
Like many of the languages of Arnhem Land, Marra cardinal directions correspond closely with English "north, south, east, west", but have intricate case morphology.

There are also directional words for "up" and "down" (i.e., upriver, downhill, etc.) that display a similar morphological complexity:

Interrogation
Yes-no questions in Marra are identical to assertions, with a slight intonation difference. There is no tag for these statements (an equivalent to the English "right?" or "arent you?"), though the local English-based creoles question marker  occasionally appears in modern Marra speech.

If the distinction between interrogative and indefinite is unclear from context, the adverb  "maybe" can be added to indicate that the phrase is an assertion and not a question.

These interrogative words take a prefix to mark number and gender – masculine singular is the default, though any additional presupposed information can be included in the marking. Case suffixes can also be marked. These particles are typically clause-initial and then followed by the assertion whose details are being elicited. For instance,  literally means "for what? he went" with the sense of "why did he go?" and  means "what? you killed it" or "what did you kill?".

Verbal morphology
A basic verb complex in Marra consists of a pronominal prefix, an inflectable verb-stem, and suffixes marking tense, aspect, and mood. Often, however, there is an uninflectable "main verb" that specifies the meaning of the verb that is then followed by the inflectable "auxiliary verb". Some verbs in Marra can only be main verbs or auxiliary verbs, though many can serve in both positions.

Order of the verb complex
The morphemes of the verb are ordered in the complex as follows:

 Negative (prefix  or preceding word  or )
 Benefactive  or  Main verb
 Centripetal  or  Third person present marker  Pronoun prefix
 Reduplication of any prior prefixes
 Durative stem-initial prefix
 Auxiliary verb
 Tense, aspect, mood suffix
The centripetal particle is used to indicate motion within the speaker’s frame of reference, with the idea of the motion coming "back" or "This way". It is the only way to distinguish the meaning of verbs "to take" from "to bring" or "to go" from "to come".

Inflectional categories
Marra has sixteen possible inflectional (tense/aspect/mood) categories:
 Past punctual positive
 Past continuous durative positive
 Past continuous nondurative positive
 Past potential positive
 Past potential negative
 Past negative
 Present negative
 Present positive
 Evitative positive
 Future indefinite positive
 Future punctual positive
 Future continuous durative positive
 Future continuous nondurative positive
 Imperative positive
 Desiderative positive
 Future negative

Marra aspect is split between continuous and punctual (also known as "perfective") actions, with the former divided into durative (happened throughout) and non-durative (happened over time, but not the entire time). The positive/negative division distinguishes things that did, are, or will happen from things that did not, are not, or will not happen, a category termed in the analyses of some neighboring languages as "irrealis".

The "future indefinite" category is quite rare and takes the meaning of "might". The "past potential" refers to something that was just about to happen (but didn't, due to an interruption) or should have happened.

The evitative category might be translated as "lest" or "or else", indicating that something undesirable might occur if something else is or is not done. For example,  means "give it to me, or else I will hit you". Note that the evitative is normally paired with another clause (as Heath says, it “does not normally stand alone as a simple prediction of impending doom”), usually in the imperative.

The past continuous durative positive, present negative/positive, future indefinite positive, future continuous durative positive, and desiderative positive all take a "durative" morpheme in the verb complex's "durative stem-initial prefix" slot; all other categories are unmarked.

The forms of these suffixes differ by auxiliary verb.

Pronominal prefixes
As in Warndarrang and other related languages, a different pronominal prefix is added to the verb for each combination of subject and object. For example, a verb with a second-person singular subject and a first-person exclusive dual object would take the prefix  but the person-person exclusive dual subject with a third-person dual object would take the prefix . Within the second-person subject, third-person object paradigm, there are also different pronouns for imperative and non-imperative verbs. There are extremely complicated rules, with many exceptions, for generating these pronouns.
When the third person or third person subject/third person object category is marked, the additional prefix  is added to the complex.

Syntax

Word order
Within a noun phrase (NP) or verb complex, word order is almost completely fixed. Articles are followed by demonstrative pronouns are followed by the main noun are followed by adjectives, though genitive pronouns may either follow or precede the main noun. For verbs, the negative particles must immediately precede the verb complex, and within the complex the order of the morphemes is strictly set.

Within the clause, however, the order of the NPs, verb complexes, and adverbs is free. The first element is typically considered to be the most important element. If the first element is not a verb complex, the main verb complex commonly but not always assumes the second position; there appears to be no difference in meaning between those sentences that place the verb complex in the second position and those that do not.

Subordinated clauses

Avoidance terminology
Marra, like many languages of the area, has taboos preventing the direct interaction of siblings of the opposite sex, beginning around age eight (the age of circumcision in males).

Marra does not have the complex avoidance speech or male-female language distinction that is found in neighboring Yanyula. Men are, however, not supposed to pronounce the names of their mother-in-law (wife’s mother), their wife mother brother, or their wife brother, though these taboos are relaxed as a man ages.

Comparison of the Marran languages
Warndarrang (a language not spoken since 1974) and Marra (a language with only a small number of speakers) are each other’s closest relatives. Together with Alawa (also critically endangered) and Yugul (a language attested by speakers of Warndarrang, Marra, and Alawa but apparently extinct, these languages form the Marran subgroup of the Gunwinyguan language family. The three documented languages share much vocabulary and have many similar grammatical structures, though there are significant differences, and Warndarrang has been heavily influenced by loanwords from Nunggubuyu and Ngandi to the north.

Verbal comparison
All three languages are prefixing, and their verbs consist of either a single inflected stem or an uninflected "main verb" preceding an inflected auxiliary verb. Such verbal particles are absent in the languages to the north.  The Marran languages also share verbal features such as particle reduplication within the verbal complex indicating a repeated or continuous action (a pattern common in Australian languages), and the negation of verbs is indicated by a particle immediately preceding the verb complex ( in both Warndarang and Marra but  in Alawa).
 
Marra has a significantly more complex verbal inflection system than Warndarrang (sixteen different tense/aspect/mood categories in Marra but only eight in Warndarrang and apparently seven in Alawa), an unusually intricate system for Australian languages.  Both languages, however, have conjugation paradigms that are highly verb-specific.

In addition to the similarities in the order of the verb complex, Marra and Warndarrang also both use word-order to focus, or highlight, a particular item within the clause, though otherwise the word-order in Marra is far stricter than that in Warndarrang.

Nominal comparison
Alawa divides its nouns into two genders (masculine and feminine)  while Marra has three classes (masculine, feminine, and neuter) and Warndarrang six. All three languages distinguish between singular, dual, and plural, with Warndarrang having an additional "paucal" (three to five) class for human nouns. The use of noun cases in Warndarrang and Marra are nearly identical – Marra condenses the allative and locative cases and adds a pergressive case – though the only cognate across the paradigm is the purposive . The case marking system of Alawa is apparently not related.  The demonstratives in Warndarrang and Marra cover approximately the same semantic categories (proximate, immediate, distant, and anaphoric, though Warndarrang adds an intermediate near-distant), though the forms themselves have little similarity. In fact, the Marra demonstratives inflect for case, number, and gender, while Warndarrang demonstratives engage a single basic form. Again, the Alawa demonstrative system is entirely separate, drawing only a single distance distinction ("this" versus "that") but with more nuanced anaphoric distinctions.

Marra also has an up/down directional distinction that is absent in Warndarrang. There is no Alawa data for cardinal directions.

Lexical comparison
Cultural terminology between the three languages is distinct. Marra has an extremely complex kinship terminology system, including a large number of dyadic terms; Warndarrang’s system appeared to be much simpler, though the linguist Jeffrey Heath was unable to elicit much kinship information before his informant died. Alawa has a morphologically-irregular system similar to Marra, but lacks the dyadic terms and shares few cognates (exceptions include baba for "older sibling"). A cursory analysis of the flora-fauna terms in the three languages also reveals few cognates. The semi-moieties in Warndarrang and Marra have nearly identical names, however, though the groups were associated with different totems, songs, and rituals.

See also
Non-Pama–Nyungan languages
Grammatical aspect

Notes

References

 Capell, A. 1960. “The Wandarang and other tribal myths of the Yabuduruwa ritual.” Oceania 30: 206-224.
 Heath, J. 1976. “North-east Arnhem Land.” In Grammatical Categories in Australian Languages, ed. R. M. W. Dixon, 735-740. Canberra: Australian Institute of Aboriginal Studies.
 Heath, J. 1980. Basic Materials in Warndarang: Grammar, Texts, and Dictionary.  Canberra: Pacific Linguistics.
 Heath, J. 1981. Basic Materials in Mara: Grammar, Texts, and Dictionary. Canberra: Pacific Linguistics.
 Heath, J. 1984. “Massacre at Hodgson Downs.” In This Is What Happened: Historical narratives by Aborigines, ed. L. Hercus and P. Sutton, 177-181. Canberra: Australian Institute of Aboriginal Studies.
 Sharpe, M. C. 1972. Alawa phonology and grammar. Canberra: Australian Institute of Aboriginal Studies.
 Sharpe, M. C. 1976. “Alawa, Mara and Warndarang.” In Grammatical Categories in Australian Languages'', ed. R. M. W. Dixon, 708-729. Canberra: Australian Institute of Aboriginal Studies.

Endangered indigenous Australian languages in the Northern Territory
Mangarrayi–Maran languages